Chrystal Callahan , is a Toronto-born American Canadian visual artist, photographer, journalist and fashion model.

Career

In 2015, Callahan released the photo series, "The Dirty War - Selfies of Terrorism, Virtue and Covert Sexuality" which appeared in ELLE Magazine. Callahan works in series, typically photographing herself in a range of attires and props. She shoots her photos alone in her studio, embracing various roles as the subject, director, hair & make-up artist, stylist, model and photographer.

Callahan began hosting Highlights of the Week with Chrystal Callahan in June, 2009. It was a subtitled English-language television show in Russia's North Caucasus Republic of Chechnya.

In 2008, Callahan wrote, produced and directed Greco Roman Grozny, a film about three teens attempting to escape war torn Chechnya through competitive Greco Roman wrestling.

In July 2010, Callahan launched a new program called "Chechnya Through The Eyes of Chrystal Callahan". It is focused on travel / tourist destinations in the Chechen Republic, Islam and Chechen Culture.

Callahan has been dubbed the "Maverick Model". She embarked on a singing career under the stage name of KRISTALL and became a popstar in the North Caucasus. She performed songs in the Russian and Chechen language.

Criticism and praise

Callahan has had some criticism for working in Chechnya. Critics see her as a supporter of pro-Russian Chechen president Ramzan Kadyrov and accuse her of being a propaganda tool for the Chechen government. Callahan has been compared to Walter Duranty, the British journalist who won a Pulitzer Prize in 1932 for a set of stories written in 1931 on the Soviet Union. CNN featured Callahan in the summer of 2010 and credited her as being a symbol of stability and peace after years of conflict in the unstable region.

References

External links
 
 Grozny Gossip, blog during her time in Chechnya

Female models from Ontario
Canadian television hosts
Canadian photographers
Canadian women artists
Canadian women photographers
American women photographers
Russian television personalities
Living people
Artists from Toronto
Year of birth missing (living people)
Canadian women television hosts
Russian women television presenters
American women television presenters
21st-century American women